is the Japanese craft of silk cloth practised in Kumejima, Okinawa Prefecture.  is the oldest type of  in Japan, out of the approximately two hundred forms of , and is the oldest  fabric. It is recognised as one of the Important Intangible Cultural Properties of Japan.

History
Silk production has been practiced in Kumejima since the 15th century, after a local, having studied sericulture in Ming Dynasty China, transmitted the techniques. Mulberry plants, the primary foodstuff of silkworms, is said to grow particularly well on the island.

By the 17th century,  formed part of the tribute paid to the Ryūkyū Kings, and it was transported to Edo via the Satsuma Domain.

Production
Silk floss is extracted from silkworm cocoons and spun by hand into yarn. Finally it is woven with a  loom, and fulled by block.

Intangible Cultural Property

See also
Important Intangible Cultural Properties of Japan
National Treasures of Japan - Dyeing and weaving
Representative List of the Intangible Cultural Heritage of Humanity
Sericulture

, another form of  produced in Yūki

References

Silk
Japanese words and phrases
Textile-related meibutsu
Important Intangible Cultural Properties of Japan
Okinawan culture
Kumejima, Okinawa